Danell Libby (born  in Orofino, Idaho) is an American wheelchair curler.

She participated in the 2006 Winter Paralympics where American team finished on seventh place.

Teams

References

External links 

Living people
1968 births
People from Orofino, Idaho
American female curlers
American wheelchair curlers
Paralympic wheelchair curlers of the United States
Wheelchair curlers at the 2006 Winter Paralympics
American wheelchair curling champions
21st-century American women